Trimerelysin I (Trimeresurus metalloendopeptidase I, hemorrhagic proteinase HR1A, hemorrhagic metalloproteinase HR1A, metalloproteinase HR1A) is an enzyme. This enzyme catalyses the following chemical reaction

 Cleavage of only two bonds His10-Leu and Ala14-Leu in the insulin B chain

This endopeptidase is present in the venom of the habu snake (Trimeresurus flavoviridis).

References

External links 
 

EC 3.4.24